HMS Snapdragon was a  that served in the Royal Navy and was built by Smith's Dock Company in 1940. She was named after Snapdragon. Commissioned in 1940 and sunk by Luftwaffe on 19 December 1942.

Design and description
In early 1939, with the risk of war with Nazi Germany increasing, it was clear to the Royal Navy that it needed more escort ships to counter the threat from Kriegsmarine U-boats. One particular concern was the need to protect shipping off the east coast of Britain. What was needed was something larger and faster than trawlers, but still cheap enough to be built in large numbers, preferably at small merchant shipyards, as larger yards were already busy. To meet this requirement, the Smiths Dock Company of Middlesbrough, a specialist in the design and build of fishing vessels, offered a development of its 700-ton,  whale catcher Southern Pride. They were intended as small convoy escort ships that could be produced quickly and cheaply in large numbers. Despite naval planners' intentions that they be deployed for coastal convoys, their long range meant that they became the mainstay of Mid-Ocean Escort Force convoy protection during the first half of the war. The original Flowers had the standard RN layout, consisting of a raised forecastle, a well deck, then the bridge or wheelhouse, and a continuous deck running aft. The crew quarters were in the foc'sle while the galley was at the rear, making for poor messing arrangements.

The modified Flowers saw the forecastle extended aft past the bridge to the aft end of the funnel, a variation known as the "long forecastle" design. Apart from providing a very useful space where the whole crew could gather out of the weather, the added weight improved the ships' stability and speed and was retroactively applied to a number of the original Flower-class vessels during the mid and latter years of the war.

Construction and career
Snapdragon was laid down by Smith's Dock Company at their shipyard at South Bank, on 27 September 1939 and launched on3 September 1940. She was commissioned on 28 October 1940.

HMS Snapdragon was on a mission off Benghazi, Libya when she was expectedly attacked by German Luftwaffe bombers and sank.

References

Sources
 
 
 
 
 

 

Flower-class corvettes of the Royal Navy
1940 ships
World War II shipwrecks in the Mediterranean Sea
Ships sunk by German aircraft
Corvettes sunk by aircraft